Eutetrapha is a genus of longhorn beetles of the subfamily Lamiinae, containing the following species:

 Eutetrapha biscostata Hayashi, 1994
 Eutetrapha chrysochloris (Bates, 1879)
 Eutetrapha cinnabarina Pu, 1986
 Eutetrapha elegans Hayashi, 1966
 Eutetrapha laosensis Breuning, 1965
 Eutetrapha lini Chou, Chung & Lin, 2014
 Eutetrapha metallescens (Motschulsky, 1860)
 Eutetrapha nephele (Heer, 1847) †
 Eutetrapha ocelota (Bates, 1873)
 Eutetrapha sedecimpunctata (Motschulsky, 1860)
 Eutetrapha striolata Zhang J. F., 1989 †
 Eutetrapha terenia Zhang J. F., Sun B. & Zhang X., 1994 †

References

Saperdini